The women's 500 meter race of the 2015 World Single Distance Speed Skating Championships was held on 14 February 2015.

Results
The first run was started at 15:00 and the second run at 16:32.

References

Women's 500 metres
World